Silver Point is an unincorporated community in Putnam County, Tennessee, United States.

Geography
Silver Point is mostly scattered around the intersection of Tennessee State Route 141, Tennessee State Route 56, and Interstate 40, about halfway between Cookeville and Smithville.

Landmarks
Notable features include the National Register of Historic Places-listed West End Church of Christ Silver Point. Edgar Evins State Park and Center Hill Lake are also nearby.

Climate
Silver Point's climate is humid subtropical (Köppen Cfa, Trewartha Cf), giving the area mild winters and hot, humid summers.

Notable people
Notable natives include journalist Christine Sadler and her brother James C. Sadler.

References

Unincorporated communities in Putnam County, Tennessee
Unincorporated communities in Tennessee